Palm wine is an alcoholic beverage.

Palm wine may also refer to:
 Palm-wine music, a West African musical genre
 The Palm-Wine Drinkard, a book by the Nigerian writer Amos Tutuola